The 2022 Spikers' Turf season was the fifth season of the men's volleyball league Spikers' Turf, which began on August 30, 2022 with only one conference.

No tournament was held in 2020 and 2021 due to the COVID-19 pandemic.

Open Conference

Participating teams

Preliminary round

Final round

Semifinals

Finals

Awards

Final standings

Conference results

See also 
 2022 Premier Volleyball League season

References 

Spikers' Turf
2022 in Philippine sport